Griswell's or Griswell's Station was a stagecoach station of the Butterfield Overland Mail located along the Gila River in Arizona.  It was located 12 miles east of Peterman's Station and 15 miles west of Flap Jack Ranch Station.

It can be seen on the USGS 1:24K topographic map Horn, AZ.

References

External links
  Griswells (historical), Arizona, Horn, Arizona Topographic Map
  Griswells (historical), Arizona (Locale)
  Griswells (historical)

Butterfield Overland Mail in New Mexico Territory
Ghost towns in Arizona
American frontier
Pre-statehood history of Arizona
History of Arizona
Former populated places in Yuma County, Arizona
Stagecoach stations in Arizona
Locale (geographic)